Philippe de Buyster (1595 – 1688), was a Flemish-French sculptor.

Biography
He was born in Antwerp and became a pupil of Gillis van Papenhoven. He moved to Paris in about 1622, where in 1632 he became 'Sculpteur ordinaire du Roi' and lived to a great age. He worked on numerous funeral monuments and decorations for the Royal court, often collaborating with Jacques Sarazin. His widow remarried the painter Pieter Rijsbraeck. Their son John Michael Rysbrack later became a sculptor while another son Pieter Andreas Rysbrack became a painter.

He is known for mythological subjects.

He died in Paris.

References

1595 births
1688 deaths
Flemish sculptors (before 1830)
17th-century French sculptors
French male sculptors
Artists from Antwerp
Emigrants from the Holy Roman Empire to France